"Il faut savoir" (You've got to learn) is a song written in 1961 by Armenian-French artist Charles Aznavour.

History
For the first time it was released as a single in 1961 by Barclay Records, with Paul Mauriat's arrangement.

It was a No 1 hit in France in 1961 (for 15 weeks) and No 42 hit of 1962 in Italy.

Adaptations
You've got to learn, written by M. Stellman (English)

Cover versions
 Steve Lawrence
 Fausto Papetti (1962)

See also
Il faut savoir

References

External links

Charles Aznavour songs
French songs
Songs written by Charles Aznavour
1961 songs
1961 singles
Barclay (record label) singles